KORT (1230 AM) is a radio station  broadcasting a classic hits format. Licensed to Grangeville, Idaho, United States, the station is currently owned by James Nelly, Jr. and Darcy Nelly through licensee Nelly Broadcasting Idaho, LLC, and features programming from Cumulus Media Networks.

History
The station began as a construction permit in 1953 owned by Far West Radio, Inc. The station's first call letters were KFWR, with studios and tower at the present location off of Highway 95 in Grangeville. The station received its license to cover in 1954. In 1957, the station changed its call letters to the current KORT. It was then owned by the Clearwater Broadcasting Company, followed by the Lewis Clark Broadcasting Company and 4-K Radio, Inc. The station was then sold in 2015 to its present owners.

References

External links

FCC history cards for KORT

ORT (AM)
Classic hits radio stations in the United States
Radio stations established in 1954
1954 establishments in Idaho